The Elmwood Millionaires is a now defunct Canadian Junior Hockey team in the Manitoba Junior Hockey League. The Millionaires, based in Elmwood, Manitoba, won 5 straight Turnbull Cup Championships as Manitoba Junior ‘A’ Champions, 1927, 1928, 1929, 1930 & 1931, and a 6th in 1936. The 1929 Elmwood Millionaires won the Abbott Cup as western Canadian junior hockey champions. They went on to lose the Memorial Cup to the Toronto Marlboros. The 1931 Elmwood Millionaires defied the odds as they won both the Abbott Cup as Western Champions and the Memorial Cup as National Junior Champs even though they were heavy underdogs. The moniker was also used to describe the 1970s & 80's senior team playing in the Canadian Amateur Senior Hockey League as the EK/Elmwood Millionaires.

Roster: Duke McDonald, Cliff Workman, Gordie McKenzie, Boyd Johnson, "Spunk" Duncanson, and Earl Adam (Manager), George Brown, Kitson Massey, Art Rice-Jones, Bill MacKenzie (Captain), Norm Yellowlees, Archie Creighton, Jack Hughes (Coach).

The 1921 and 1931 Elmwood Millionaires were inducted into the Manitoba Hockey Hall of Fame in the team category.

Championships
1931 Memorial Cup Champions

NHL Alumni

George Brown
Bill Kendall
Bobby Kirk
Bill MacKenzie
Sam McAdam
Babe Pratt
Gus Rivers
Joe Shack

External links
1929 Elmwood Millionaires at Manitoba Hockey Hall of Fame
1931 Elmwood Millionaires at Manitoba Hockey Hall of Fame

Defunct Manitoba Junior Hockey League teams
Ice hockey teams in Winnipeg